Made in Chelsea: South of France, a spin-off series of Made in Chelsea, a British structured-reality television programme, was confirmed on 8 June 2016, and began airing on 1 August 2016. and concluded after six episodes on 5 September 2016. It was announced that the cast of Made in Chelsea would be travelling to Cannes to film a special series of the show. It was revealed that this would be a stand-alone series which would not be promoted as the twelfth series. The twelfth series followed in October 2016. This is the third spin-off show filmed away from Chelsea following NYC in 2014 and LA in 2015. The series featured the return of former cast member Francis Boulle. Whilst most of the Chelsea cast featured in this spin-off, there was notable absences from Josh "JP" Patterson and Rosie Fortescue. It is the only series to include French cast member Lukas Avalon, the last to include Louise's ex-boyfriend Alik Alfus, and first to include her new boyfriend Ryan Libbey.

The series focused heavily on the love triangle between Francis, Olivia and Toff before he finally chooses to be with Olivia causing bitterness for Toff, as well as both Jess and Ollie finding holiday romances. It also included the demise of Alex and Jamie's long-term friendship as Jamie chose to believe Frankie over Alex following multiple revelations.

Cast

Episodes

{| class="wikitable plainrowheaders" style="width:100%; background:#fff;"
|- style="color:black"
! style="background: #CFF8B8;"| SeriesNo.
! style="background: #CFF8B8;"| EpisodeNo.
! style="background: #CFF8B8;"| Title
! style="background: #CFF8B8;"| Original airdate
! style="background: #CFF8B8;"| Duration
! style="background: #CFF8B8;"| UK viewers

|}

Ratings

References

2016 British television seasons
British television spin-offs
Cannes
South of France
Television shows set in France